If You Can't Join 'Em... Beat 'Em is the second studio album by DJ Format.

Track listing
 "Intro"
 "3 Feet Deep" (featuring Abdominal & D-Sisive)
 "Participation Prerequisite" (featuring Abdominal)
 "Another One of Those Songs" (featuring D-Sisive)
 "The Turning Point"
 "Ugly Brothers" (featuring Abdominal)
 "Separated At Birth" (featuring Abdominal & D-Sisive)
 "The Place" (featuring Chali 2na & Akil)
 "Rap Machine" (featuring Abdominal)
 "Black Cloud"
 "I'm Good" (featuring Abdominal)
 "2,3.. Scrape (Remix)"

Samples

"Participation Prerequisite" includes Power Montage by Keith Mansfield

References

2005 albums
DJ Format albums